Alphitobiini is a tribe of darkling beetles in the family Tenebrionidae. There are about eight genera in Alphitobiini.

Genera
These genera belong to the tribe Alphitobiini:
 Alphitobius Stephens, 1829  (North America, the Palearctic, Indomalaya, and Oceania)
 Ardoinia Kaszab, 1969  (tropical Africa)
 Diaclina Jacquelin du Val, 1861  (the Palearctic, tropical Africa, Indomalaya, and Australasia)
 Epipedodema Gebien, 1921  (tropical Africa)
 Guanobius Grimm, 2008  (Indomalaya)
 Hoplopeltis Fairmaire, 1894  (Indomalaya)
 Peltoides Laporte, 1833  (tropical Africa)
 † Alphitopsis Kirejtshuk, Nabozhenko & Nel, 2011

References

Further reading

 
 

Tenebrionoidea